Rita Moss (born Loreta L. Waynesboro; July 4, 1918 – July 16, 2015) was an American jazz and ballad singer, notable for her four-octave vocal range. Although she took piano lessons as a child, she was a mostly self-taught multi-instrumentalist who could play piano, organ and drums. She was born in Cabin Creek, Kanawha, West Virginia and grew up in Long Island, New York.  She credited the discovery of her vocal range to singing along to saxophonist Freddy Gardner's recording of "Body and Soul", a record she had turned up in a Manhattan store's bargain bin.

Career
Moss first came to attention following a 1949 debut at New York's Park Avenue Restaurant, where public reception led to a stay of over 7 months. Appearances in London, Ontario and Cleveland, Ohio followed, including performances at jazz DJ and impresario Leonard Feather's concerts. Initially billed as "Reta" Moss, her first single was released in January 1950 on Futurama Records, a local label run by Main Stem record store owner Arthur Bangel. Bangel formed Futurama to cut jazz, blues and rhythm, including artists involved in Feathers' contemporary bop concerts at Carnegie Hall.

In the early 1950s, Moss cut a few singles on Debonair, Decca and Mercury, including a four-song EP on Clef (Verve) in 1952 with Chicago's George Williams Orchestra, although her first LP, Introducing Rita Moss, was issued by Epic Records only in 1956. The selections were standards by Hart, Rodgers, Gershwin, Webster and Ellington; the release was notable in that one number was an original by Moss. A brief review in Billboard notes her "remarkable" vocal range and "breezy whimsical style". In 1956, she headlined at the Living Room night club in New York, and in 1957, decided to head for the West Coast.

From 1957 to 1966 Moss appears to have focused on touring and night-club appearances. Sporadic singles cropped up on obscure labels and a four-song EP appeared on Moss's private Los Angeles-based label Rozell, including at least one self-penned song, "Bobby's Blues", copyrighted under the name of Rita Roszelle. This period shows Moss honing exotica type vocal gymnastics in the vein of Yma Sumac to whom she had earlier drawn comparisons. The Gothic single features an arranging credit to Jack Montrose, a key West Coast jazz figure. The turn of the 1960s saw Moss playing LA area venues including Hollywood's Exotica Club and the Tahitian Village. In 1964 she did two consecutive extended stints at the Riverside Hotel's Showboat Lounge, playing simultaneous organ and piano with vocal. In 1966 she turned up at a popular San Diego club where her second album, of live material, Rita Moss Reigns at Islandia, was issued on the Islandia's house label and generated considerable local acclaim for her vocal range, Sumac-esque stylizing and scat vocals. Airplay and coverage by radio and TV stations such as KOGO, KFMX and KFMB (then home of Regis Philbin) attracted the attention of Dot Records who went on to issue three albums.

Talk to Me Tiger!, the first Dot LP, consisted of several familiar live club repertoire numbers from the Islandia LP, plus ballad material; the next LP, Superb, was arranged and conducted by Marty Paich. In 1968, the third and last Dot LP produced a now obscure eponymous single, that would become arguably Moss's most enduring song: "Just a Dream Ago", although the LP also included a worthy cover of "Sleep Safe and Warm", the theme from the film Rosemary's Baby.

A captivating night-club performer rather than a recording artist, "Queen Moss" to her performance fans, her impressive vocal talents and musical ambidexterity in a live setting failed to translate into record sales and broad appeal.

In the 1970s Moss recorded an LP of spiritual jazz issued on the private Retep label in San Diego. The compositions were mostly self-penned, with a lyrics co-credit to Dr. Russell Paul Schofield, founder-director of Actualism for Lightworkers, a spiritual training regime. Moss continued to perform live in San Diego and Los Angeles into the 2000s.

Personal life
Lorita Waynesboro was born to parents Wayne Bernice Waynesboro and Minnie Peters. Prior to her settlement in New York, school and marriage records place Moss in Charleston, West Virginia and Lawrence, Ohio. She graduated with honors in 1936 from Garnet High School in Charleston, and played Mendelssohn's "War March of The Priests" on piano at the convocation. She had two sisters, Elnore and Frances, three and seven years younger respectively.

In October 1935, she copyrighted a song called "You've Set My Heart On Fire" as Lorita Waynesboro, and in August 1937 she copyrighted another, called "Confusion" under the name of Lorita Waynesboro Davis. Moss appears to have never publicly discussed her family life; records show her father serving jail time as of 1935 and in a court case with Minnie over a property dispute, and as of 1940 the entire family living in an extended household with Fred Waynesboro (to whom Minnie is now married), and Lorita, now 21, married to Melvin Davis.

She married Herbert Richard Moss on March 15, 1944 in Lawrence, Ohio, and retained the Moss surname for the duration of her professional career.

As of 1964, Rita Moss was married to Bob Roszelle who was also her manager.

She died on July 16, 2015 at her residence in San Diego, California, at the age of 97.

Discography
1950 - "Tradin' In the Old for a New" / "I'm in the Middle Again"; Futurama 3009 single
1951 - "I Never Was So Surprised" / "I'll Be Waiting for You"; Glenn Records 1001 78rpm. Billed as Rita Moss and The Satisfiers (Sonny Dunham Orchestra)
1951 - "Darlin'" / "Love Me or Please Let Me Be"; Decca 27873 single 78rpm
1953 - "You Never Had It So Good" / "When Day Is Done"; Mercury/Clef 89024 78rpm 89024x45 45rpm single
1953 - "You Never Had It So Good" / "When Day Is Done" / "Happiness Is Just a Thing Called Joe" / "Memories of You"; Clef EPC 256 45rpm
1956 - Introducing Rita Moss; Epic LN 3201 LP (12"), Philips B-07865R (10")
1957 - "My Ole Kentucky Home" / "I Should Know"; Debonair 1839 single 45rpm
1959 - A-side: "Daydream" / "Bobby's Blues" / B-side: "CHY-A-CHA" / "Irish Jag"; Rozell K80H-1198
1959 - A-side: "Irish Jag" / "Linger Awhile" / B-side: "Passion Flower" / "Bobby's Blues"; 45rpm EP V-Tone V-101
1960 - "Zatika Part 1" / "Zatika Part 2"; Rozell 205 single 
1961 - "Jaggin'" / "Exactly Like You" (as "Voices of Rita Moss); Gothic 003 45rpm single
1964 - "Jingle Bells" / "I'm Shooting High"; Arvee 5084 single 45rpm
1964 - "My Melancholy Baby" / "Red Balloon"; Challenge 59245 45rpm single
1966 - Reigns at Islandia; retep RTP-M 1381 LP
1966 - Talk to Me, Tiger!; Dot DLP 25763 (S) 3763 (M) LP | digital re-release in 2011 on Cleopatra Records UPC: 885686557044
1968 - Superb; Dot DLP 25839 (S) 3838 (M) LP
1968 - "Just a Dream Ago" / "The Measure of a Man"; Dot 17120 45rpm single
1968 - Just a Dream Ago; Dot DLP 25889 (S) LP
1977 - Inner Experience Vol. 1; Retep CG-011 LP

References

1918 births
2015 deaths
American jazz singers
People from Long Island
Singers with a four-octave vocal range
Singers from New York (state)
People from Cabin Creek, West Virginia